Edwin Ernest Salpeter (3 December 1924 – 26 November 2008,) was an Austrian–Australian–American astrophysicist.

Life
Born in Vienna to a Jewish family, Salpeter emigrated from Austria to Australia while in his teens to escape the Nazis. He attended Sydney Boys High School (1939–40) and Sydney University, where he obtained his bachelor's degree in 1944 and his master's degree in 1945. In the same year he was awarded an overseas scholarship and attended the University of Birmingham, England, where he earned his doctorate in 1948 under the supervision of Sir Rudolf Peierls.  He spent the remainder of his career at Cornell University, where he was the James Gilbert White Distinguished Professor of the Physical Sciences. Salpeter died of leukemia at his home in Ithaca, New York on 26 November 2008.

Scientific contributions
In 1951 Salpeter suggested that stars could burn helium-4 into carbon-12 with the Triple-alpha process not directly, but through an intermediate metastable state of beryllium-8, which helped to explain the carbon production in stars. He later derived the initial mass function for the formation rates of stars of different mass in the Galaxy.

Salpeter wrote with Hans Bethe two articles in 1951 which introduced the equation bearing their names, the Bethe–Salpeter equation which describes the interactions between a pair of fundamental particles under a quantum field theory.

In 1955 he found the Salpeter function or the initial mass function (IMF). It shows that the number of stars in each mass range decreases rapidly with increasing mass.

In 1964 Salpeter and independently Yakov B. Zel'dovich were the first to suggest that accretion discs around massive black holes are responsible for the huge amounts of energy radiated by quasars (which are the brightest active galactic nuclei). This is currently the most accepted explanation for the physical origin of active galactic nuclei and the associated extragalactic relativistic jets.

In early 1970s, Salpeter discovered that molecular hydrogen and many other molecular species are formed in the interstellar medium not as much in the gas phase but primarily on the surfaces of dust particles.

Family
In 1950 he married Miriam (Mika) Mark (1929–2000), a neurobiologist born in Riga, Latvia; she was chairwoman of the department of neurobiology and behavior at Cornell from 1982 to 1988. The Society for Neuroscience created the Mika Salpeter award in her memory; it "recognizes an individual with outstanding career achievements in neuroscience who has also significantly promoted the professional advancement of women in neuroscience." The Salpeters had two daughters, Judy Salpeter and Dr. Shelley Salpeter.
After Miriam's death, Edwin married Antonia Shouse.

Honors
Carnegie Institution for Science Award for Research in Astrophysics (1959)
Member of the American Academy of Arts and Sciences (1967)
Member of the United States National Academy of Sciences (1967)
Gold Medal of the Royal Astronomical Society (1973)
Henry Norris Russell Lectureship (1974)
J. Robert Oppenheimer Memorial Prize (1974)
Member of the American Philosophical Society (1977)
Karl Schwarzschild Medal (1985)
Bruce Medal (1987)
Dirac Medal (1996)
Crafoord Prize (with Fred Hoyle) (1997)
Hans Bethe Prize (1999)

References

External links

 Bruce Medal page
 bio page
 Oral History interview transcript with Edwin Ernest Salpeter on 30 March 1978, American Institute of Physics, Niels Bohr Library & Archives - interview conducted by Spencer Weart at Newman Laboratory, Cornell University
 Interviewed by  Mark Turin on 12 November 2008 (video)
 Yervant Terzian, "Edwin E. Salpeter," Biographical Memoirs of the National Academy of Sciences (2009)

1924 births
2008 deaths
Members of the United States National Academy of Sciences
Austrian emigrants to Australia
Australian expatriates in the United Kingdom
Australian emigrants to the United States
20th-century American astronomers
Jewish scientists
20th-century Australian astronomers
Foreign Members of the Royal Society
Members of the Eurasian Astronomical Society
Cornell University faculty
Recipients of the Gold Medal of the Royal Astronomical Society
Fellows of the Australian Academy of Science
Alumni of the University of Birmingham
Members of the American Philosophical Society